The End of Eternity is a 1955 science fiction novel by Isaac Asimov with mystery and thriller elements on the subjects of time travel and social engineering. Its premise is that of a causal loop, a type of temporal paradox in which events and their causes form a loop.

In The End of Eternity, members of the time-changing organization Eternity seek to ensure that the conditions that led to its founding occur as history says that they occurred. The protagonist, Andrew Harlan, is placed in a situation in which he must decide whether to allow the "circle" to close and Eternity to be founded or to allow the opposite to happen and prevent Eternity from having ever existed.

Many years later, Asimov tied this novel into his broader Foundation Series by hinting in Foundation's Edge that it is set in a universe where Eternity had existed but was destroyed by Eternals, leading to an all-human galaxy later.

The novel was shortlisted to the Hugo Award for Best Novel.

Plot
In the future, humanity uses time travel to construct Eternity, an organization "outside time" that aimed to improve human happiness by observing human history and, after careful analysis, directly making small actions that cause "reality changes" and help to establish trade between the various centuries to help those in most need. Its members, known as "Eternals" and by the roles that they hold, prioritize the reduction of human suffering at the cost of a loss to technology, art, and other endeavors, which are prevented from existing when they are judged to have a detrimental effect. Those enlisted travel "upwhen" and "downwhen" and re-enter time in devices called "kettles". They are unable to travel to times before the 27th century, when the temporal field powering Eternity was established, the limit being known as the "downwhen terminus". Also, the future of humanity's fate is unknown since the earth is empty by the year 15 million (the 150,000th century, or the 15,000th millenia), but that is preceded by a period called the Hidden Centuries, or the Void Millennia, from the years 7 million to 15 million (the 70,000th to then150,000th centuries or 7,000th to the 15,000th millennia) in which for unknown reasons, they cannot access the world outside Eternity to learn more.

Andrew Harlan is an Eternal and an outstanding Technician, a specialist at implementing reality changes, who is fascinated by the Primitive times. Senior Computer Laban Twissell, the Dean of the Allwhen Council, instructs Harlan to teach a newcomer, Brinsley Sheridan Cooper, about the Primitive. Meanwhile, Harlan is also tasked by Assistant Computer Finge to spend a week in the 482nd century. He stays with Noÿs Lambent, a non-Eternal member of the period's aristocracy and falls in love with her. However, he discovers that a reality change will affect the century, and wishing to preserve Noÿs as she is, he breaks Eternal law, removes her from time, and hides her in the empty sections of Eternity that exist in the Hidden Centuries.

Harlan later finds that the kettles will not travel to the time in which he hid Noÿs due to a mysterious block at the 100,000th century (the year 10 million). He confronts Finge with a weapon and accuses him of sabotaging matters out of jealousy, but Finge states that he reported Harlan's conduct and denies placing the block. Harlan is summoned to the Council but is not reprimanded; he deduces that because his transgressions were ignored, he must be there to serve a larger purpose. Harlan confronts Twissell and explains that he has been teaching himself temporal mathematics and believes that its 23rd century inventor, Vikkor Mallansohn, must have been helped in his discovery by someone from his future; he concludes that his current role is training Cooper to do so. Twissell confirms that and adds that unknown to Cooper, Mallansohn's secret memoirs show that Cooper is the famous inventor Mallansohn. That must be kept from Cooper so that Eternity will be founded as it historically was. Harlan blackmails Twissell by threatening to destroy Cooper's ignorance unless Noÿs is returned, but he is outwitted. Twissell locks him in the control room with all controls deactivated other than the lever to send Cooper back, which matches the memoirs' statement that to have been was his role. Harlan, enraged, breaks open the controls and changes the power output, which causes Cooper to be sent back to an unknown time that is estimated to be in the early 20th century.

Twissell is aghast, but as Eternity still exists, he theorizes he can undo Harlan's damage and send Cooper back correctly for his mission. They think that Cooper might try to communicate by using an advertisement in one of Harlan's Primitive magazines that would stand out only to an Eternal. Harlan finds that a magazine from 1932 has changed and now shows an advertisement in the form of a mushroom cloud, which no human could have known of in 1932. However, Harlan refuses to tell Twissell about the advertisement until they bring Noÿs back from the Hidden Centuries though Twissell insists that the block Harlan encountered is theoretically impossible. As the two travel far upwhen to get her, Twissell speculates that the Hidden Centuries are a time that humans evolved into something greater and don't want to be meddled with, so they blocked off Eternity's access to Time from the 70,000th to 150,000th century. He supposes that when Harlan inhabited an Eternity outpost in the Hidden Centuries with Noÿs, these future humans may have worried that Eternity was beginning an invasion, leading them to retaliate with a kettle block at the 100,000th century to prevent any more encroachments. However, Harlan and Twissell pass the 100,000th century unhindered and find Noÿs. Harlan then agrees to travel downwhen and to bring back Cooper so that he can be sent to the correct time for his mission but only if Noÿs comes with him.

On arrival in 1932, Harlan holds Noÿs at gunpoint and reveals that he suspects her of being from the Hidden Centuries and that he has brought her so that she could not harm Eternity. Noÿs acknowledges that she is from that time and explains that her people have also developed time travel, but their method shows many possible futures, rather than just one future as is seen by Eternity. They learned that humans would have been the first species to spread into the galaxy, but in each future in which Eternity existed, safety was given a priority, and by the time that humans reach the stars, other species predominated and prevented them. As a result, humanity would become depressed and gradually die out. Noÿs's mission was to make the minimum change to history to remedy that by preventing Eternity from ever being founded. There were multiple ways of achieving that, and she chose an approach in which she and Harlan were together. Noÿs gives Harlan the choice of killing her and preserving Eternity or letting her live and allowing a different future to arise. Harlan, remembering the unhealthy interpersonal relationships between the Eternals and the sociological damage that he has seen to be done to people whose original "homewhen" had ceased to exist, begins to agree with her. Suddenly, a reality change occurs, and the kettle disappears, which indicates that Eternity now never happened. The book ends by stating that it was "the end of Eternity – and the beginning of Infinity".

Concepts
Physio-time: Relative time elapsed as perceived by an Eternal
Eternity: An organization outside normal time involved in changing history
Eternals: Member of Eternity. They do not live forever and are recruited as young men from regular time.
Homewhen: The original time of an Eternal
Upwhen: Moving forward in time or referring to a relative future
Downwhen: Moving backward in time or referring to a relative past
Kettle: Device for moving forward ("upwhen") or backward ("downwhen") in time
Minimum change: The smallest possible change that will restore or create the desired future (see also Butterfly effect)

Major characters
Andrew Harlan: An outstanding Technician, a member of Eternity who is responsible for implementing reality changes. He is appointed as Twissell's personal Technician. The real reason is later revealed to be that the memoirs of the Temporal Field inventor Vikkor Mallansohn that describe him as having that role and being responsible for training the Cub, Brinsley Cooper. Therefore, Harlan is given those tasks so that the "circle is completed," history happens as it has happened, and Eternity is established as it was.
Laban Twissell: Senior Computer and dean of the Allwhen Council, which is responsible for ensuring the events of Mallansohn's memoirs occur as described.
Hobbe Finge: Assistant Computer, who greatly dislikes and distrusts Harlan.
Noÿs Lambent: a human from the Hidden Centuries, who is first introduced as a non-Eternal member of the aristocracy from the 482nd century and is officially Finge's secretary. Her actual mission, unknown to any Eternals, is to destroy Eternity by preventing it from being founded for the eventual benefit of humanity.
Vikkor Mallansohn / Brinsley Sheridan Cooper (the Cub): Mallansohn develops the Temporal Field in the 24th century to lead to the founding of Eternity in the 27th century. He leaves a time-sealed memoir, behind which reveals that the person universally known as Vikkor Mallansohn of the 24th century was actually a Cub called Brinsley Sheridan Cooper, who was mentored by Harlan and sent back in time to teach Mallansohn the temporal field equations. After Mallansohn dies in an accident prior to the mission's completion, Cooper had taken on Mallansohn's name undetected to complete his life's work and ensure that Eternity would be founded despite the death. Cooper is unaware that will happen when he is found by Twissell living in the 78th century and is trained to be sent back in time.

Origins

In December 1953, Asimov was thumbing through a copy of the 28 March 1932 issue of Time and noticed what looked, at first glance, like a drawing of the mushroom cloud of a nuclear explosion. A closer look showed him that the drawing was actually a geyser, the Old Faithful. However, he began pondering the question of what the implications would be if there had been a drawing of a mushroom cloud in a magazine from 1932, and he eventually came up with the plot of a time travel story. He began the story, The End of Eternity, on 7 December 1953, and he finished it on 6 February 1954, when it was 25,000 words long. Asimov submitted the story to Galaxy Science Fiction, and within days, he received a call from Galaxy editor Horace L. Gold that rejected the story. Asimov decided to turn the story into a novel, and on March 17, he left it with Walter I. Bradbury, the science fiction editor at Doubleday, to get his opinion. Bradbury was receptive, and by April 7, Asimov had been informed that a contract for the novel was in the works. Asimov began expanding the story and eventually delivered the novel version to Bradbury on December 13. Doubleday accepted the novel, which was published in August 1955.

The novel reflects the state of scientific knowledge of its time, some of which has been superseded. For instance, the power source for the time travelers is referred to as "Nova Sol", and a link to the far future taps the energy of the exploding Sun. Scientists now know that the Sun is far too small to explode.

As may be seen below, the novel may also be counted as the prequel to the Empire series of novels, which form part of the Foundation Series. Asimov had already included a kind of time travel in his 1950 novel Pebble in the Sky, but it was a one-way trip.

The original End of Eternity appeared in 1986 in a collection called The Alternate Asimovs.

Reception
The book was highly acclaimed by critics. The New York Times reviewer Villiers Gerson praised the novel by stating it "has suspense on every page" and "exhibits in every chapter the plot twists for which the author is famous." In a 1972 review, Lester del Rey declared that no one "has wrung so much out of... or has developed all the possibilities of paradox."

As noted by the critic Susan Young, John Crowley's award-winning 1989 novella "Great Work of Time" has the same basic outline as The End of Eternity, a secret society of well-meaning time travelers bent on remodeling history and a young man recruited into the society to make a specific change that would bring the society itself into being. The details of what the time travelers do and when in time they operate are very different from those in Asimov's book. However, in both books, the society's operations come to a halt through the influence of people from the future for reasons that have to do with the existence of that future. Young also notes a similarity with Poul Anderson's The Corridors of Time, which also depicts a complex society of time travelers who find sections of the future inaccessible; also in Anderson's book, the intervention of the people of that further future plays a pivotal and cataclysmic role in the plot.

Charles Stross has stated that his 2009 novella Palimpsest is effectively a rewrite of The End of Eternity.

There are also similarities to John Brunner's Times Without Number, which was originally published in 1962 and revised for re-publication in 1969. However, in that story, the time-policing organization struggles in vain to prevent its own annihilation; the conclusion is that timelines in which time travel arises are unstable and cannot sustain their existence.

Role in Foundation series
As written, The End of Eternity suggests that the new reality is the one that leads onto the Galactic Empire and Foundation but does not confirm it. The mechanism of time travel is most likely not the one stumbled across in Pebble in the Sky because of Harlan's words about the energy requirement for the Temporal Field. The "neuronic whip" from The Currents of Space and other stories in the "Empire" future is also found in The End of Eternity, again as something that had to be removed from reality. There are also no aliens to compete with humans: in "Blind Alley", the aliens' predicament is rather like what will overtake humanity if Eternity is not prevented.

The original unpublished End of Eternity is clearly a different future from that of the Foundation, but Asimov says in his story-postscript that he had some idea of a bridge in the published version.

Asimov placed a hint in Foundation's Edge, many years later, that the Eternals might have been responsible for the all-human galaxy and the development of humanity on Earth of the Foundation Series, but that interpretation is disputed. Asimov himself mentions the disparity.<ref>"If you wish an account of the Eternals and the way on which they adjusted human history, you will find it (not entirely consistent with the references in the new book) in The End of Eternity ('Afterword in Foundation's Edge)".</ref> The human-like robots may have been intended to play a part.

According to Alasdair Wilkins, in a discussion posted on Gizmodo, "Asimov absolutely loves weird, elliptical structures. All three of his non-robot/Foundation science fiction novels — The End of Eternity, The Gods Themselves, and Nemesis — leaned heavily on non-chronological narratives, and he does it with gusto in The Gods Themselves."

TranslationsThe End of Eternity has been translated into over 25 languages. The Russian translation, first edition 1966, was heavily censored because of both sexual references and sociological discussions that were unacceptable to Soviet ideology.

For some time, The End of Eternity was out of print, but that was remedied with Tor Books' 2011 hardcover reissue and a recent move to various e-book formats.

 Adaptations 

 A halhatatlanság halála (1977), a TV movie directed by András Rajnai
 A television film based on the book, entitled A halhatatlanság halála (literally The Death of Immortality) was made in Hungary in 1976. The screenwriter and director was András Rajnai, and the main character was played by Jácint Juhász.
 The End of Eternity (1987), a film directed by Andrei Yermash
 It mostly follows the novel except for the ending.
 The novel ends with both Noÿs and Harlan deciding that the suppression of spaceflight by Eternity is not in the interest of humankind, and they live "happily ever after."
 In the Soviet film, the ending takes place in the mid-1980s Germany, rather than 1932 Los Angeles. Noÿs never fully describes why she wants Eternity'' destroyed, but in the middle of the movie, before her true identity is revealed, she gives some idea. Harlan yells at her that he is but a pawn in things and storms off, and there is a strong implication that he and Noÿs have no further contact. Then, a scene shows Harlan observing both Twissell and Finge in 1980s clothing getting out of a Rolls-Royce and walking together. The implication is that Twissel and Finge use Harlan as a pawn to further their own materialistic gains.
 While out of step with the rest of the film as well as the novel, the ending follows the Soviet concept that the "everyman" (Harlan) is frequently manipulated by the bourgeoisie as a pawn to its own ends. The film ends with a long shot of Harlan walking away alone from the camera down a highway.

In 2008, New Regency acquired the rights to the novel for a possible film adaptation.

References

Sources

External links
 
 
 

1955 American novels
1955 science fiction novels
Science fiction novels by Isaac Asimov
Novels about time travel
Doubleday (publisher) books
American novels adapted into films
Nonlinear narrative novels